Julie Coin and Stéphanie Foretz Gacon were the defending champions, but Coin chose not to participate. Foretz Gacon partnered with Amandine Hesse, but they lost in the semifinals.

The Australian third seeds Jarmila Gajdošová and Arina Rodionova won the tournament, defeating Verónica Cepede Royg and Stephanie Vogt in the final, 7–6(7–0), 6–1.

Seeds

Draw

References 
 Draw

Nottingham Challenge - Women's Doubles
Nottingham Challenge